Ray Hackett (né Raymond William Hackett; 5 November 1909 Carlin, Nevada – 29 March 1987 Santa Rosa, California) was an American radio broadcast and dance orchestra leader who flourished from 1928, while attending the University of Nevada, Reno, to the mid 1970s in the San Francisco Bay Area, where he spent most of his professional career.

Career 
By the age of 15 (January 1924), Hackett — billed as "The Boy Wonder" — was playing popular piano music in Reno theaters. Hackett was a 1932 graduate of the University of Nevada, Reno.  He studied philosophy with plans to become a lawyer.  In 1928, while in college, he was leading his own dance orchestra.  Following the Crash of 1929, Hackett lost his scholarship and began relying mostly on gigs from his dance band to pay tuition.  He graduated and pursued music.  His primary instrument was piano.

In 1937, Hackett became music director at CBS in San Francisco.  In 1939, he was appointed music director of the Golden Gate Exposition at Treasure Island.  By 1949, Hackett's band was booked by Music Corporation of America.

Hackett's tenure as music director for CBS in San Francisco endured through the mid-1960s.  Hackett was music director of The Bill Weaver Show with Ray Hackett and His Orchestra, which began in the mid-1950s and continued through the mid-1960s. The Bill Weaver Show was broadcast on KQW radio, later renamed KCBS, from the Palace Hotel in San Francisco.  Hackett also was the music director of the 1960 Republican National Convention in San Francisco.

Education 
Pre-college music
 Before attending high school (around 1920), Hackett began studying piano with Harriet Irene Peterson (1886–1939).

Primary and secondary schools
 Hackett attended grammar school at the Mary S. Doten School (grades 1–8) in Reno, finishing the eighth grade January 25, 1925. Hackett was a 1928 graduate of Reno High School.  In February 1928, Hackett became president of the Reno High School Senior Class.

College
 Hackett was a 1932 graduate of the University of Nevada, Reno. He majored in philosophy.

Notable orchestra members 
 Eddie Duran, jazz guitarist with the CBS Orchestra, late 1950s

Selected compositions 
Songs
 "Yearning", song with men's quartet
 By Ray Hackett and Theodore H. Post
 Arranged by Theodore H. Post (1933)
 September 27, 1933, Class E (musical composition) 38645

 "From Time To Time"
 Lyrics by Clare Eleanore Hackett, music by Raymond William Hackett
 © Sumond Music Co., March 15, 1955 Class E (unpublished musical composition) EU390223

 "Where In The World"
 Lyrics by Bradford Woodridge Young & Clare Eleanore Hackett, music by Raymond William Hackett
 © Bradford Woodrldge Young, Clare Eleanore Hackett, and Raymond William Hackett
 February 15, 1955 Class E (unpublished musical composition) EU386461

Grove plays
 The Green Mountain Boys (1963)
  Richard L. Breen, author; Raymond W. Hackett, composer; J. Fenton McKenna (1905–1995), director
 Bohemian Club, San Francisco
 Grabhorn Press, San Francisco

 The Valley of The Moon (1966); 
 Ralph Moody, author; Raymond W. Hackett, composer; J. Fenton McKenna (1905–1995), director
 Bohemian Club, San Francisco

 Taj Mahal (1981); 
 Francis N. Marshall (1907–1997), author; Raymond W. Hackett, composer-conductor; James Robert Minser (1925–1987), director
 Bohemian Club, San Francisco

Selected discography 
 The Forward Look (album; musical revues & comedies) (1956); 
 Junior League of San Francisco
 With Ray Hackett and His Orchestra

 "Come Join The Band" (78 rpm single), Raycord (19--); 
 1001; mx HR-100
 Stan Noonan's Cheerleaders; Ray Hackett and His Orchestra

 "The Indian Jumps" (78 rpm single), Raycord (19--); 
 1001; mx HR-102
 Ray Hackett and His Orchestra

 "Our Sturdy Golden Bear" (78 rpm single), Raycord (19--); 
 1002; mx HR-103
 Stan Noonan's Cheerleaders; Ray Hackett and His Orchestra

 "Oski Jumps" (78 rpm single), Raycord (19--); 
 1002; mx HR-104
 Ray Hackett and His Orchestra

Professional and fraternal affiliations 
 AFM Local 6 (San Francisco Musicians Union)
 Phi Sigma Kappa, University of Nevada, Reno (inducted around 1929)
 Bohemian Club, San Francisco (joined 1953, president 1968–69)

References 
Notes

Copyright citations
 Catalog of Copyright Entries, Part 3, Musical Compositions, New Series, Library of Congress, Copyright Office

 Catalog of Copyright Entries, Part 5B, Unpublished Musical Compositions, New Series, Library of Congress, Copyright Office

Inline citations

1909 births
1987 deaths
People from San Francisco
Musicians from Reno, Nevada
University of Nevada, Reno alumni
Musicians from the San Francisco Bay Area
20th-century American musicians